The list of bioinformatics software tools can be split up according to the license used:
List of proprietary bioinformatics software
List of open-source bioinformatics software

Alternatively, here is a categorization according to the respective bioinformatics subfield specialized on:
Sequence analysis software
List of sequence alignment software
List of alignment visualization software
Alignment-free sequence analysis
De novo sequence assemblers
List of gene prediction software
List of disorder prediction software
List of Protein subcellular localization prediction tools
List of phylogenetics software
List of phylogenetic tree visualization software
:Category:Metagenomics_software
Structural biology software
List of molecular graphics systems
List of protein-ligand docking software
List of RNA structure prediction software
List of software for protein model error verification
List of protein secondary structure prediction programs
List of protein structure prediction software
:Category:Molecular dynamics software
Structural alignment software
Other
Compression of genomic sequencing data
Bioinformatics workflow management system
List of genetic engineering software
List of systems biology visualization software
List of systems biology modelling software
2D gel analysis software
List of mass spectrometry software